John George Ajaka (born 13 January 1956), an Australian politician, was a member of the New South Wales Legislative Council from 2007 to 2021, representing the Liberal Party and he is the first Liberal Party Lebanese Australian member of an Australian parliament. Ajaka has previously served as the Minister for the Illawarra during 2013 and 2015 in the O'Farrell and first Baird government. He was also the President of the New South Wales Legislative Council until March 2021.

Until 23 January 2017, Ajaka was New South Wales Minister for Ageing from April 2014, the Minister for Disability Services from August 2013, and the Minister for Multiculturalism from April 2015 in the second Baird government. Ajaka is a member of the New South Wales Legislative Council since 2007, representing the Liberal Party and he is the first Liberal Party Lebanese Australian member of an Australian parliament. Ajaka has previously served as the Minister for the Illawarra during 2013 and 2015 in the O'Farrell and first Baird government.

Background and early years
Ajaka was born in Bulli, New South Wales, to migrant parents from Lebanon. He was schooled at St Joseph's Primary School and Marist College Kogarah where he served in the Army Cadets, graduating as the second-highest-ranking officer in his group, and served briefly in the Australian Army Reserve. He subsequently studied law and opened his own practice in Rockdale. He was later elected as a City of Rockdale councillor, serving in that role until his election to parliament.

State political career
Ajaka was elected to the Legislative Council at the 2007 state election. He made his inaugural speech to the Legislative Council on 9 May 2007, in which he called for greater acceptance of migrants within Australian society and declared his intention to oppose racial prejudice and injustice in his role as an MP. He also strongly criticised the police practice of referring to the ethnic backgrounds of criminals, contravening his own party's policy on the matter.

Ajaka was appointed as the Minister for the Illawarra and the Minister for Disability Services on 2 August 2013; and became of member of the O'Farrell cabinet. Due to the resignation of Barry O'Farrell as Premier, and the subsequent ministerial reshuffle by Mike Baird, the new Liberal Leader, in April 2014 in addition to his existing responsibilities as a minister, Ajaka was appointed as the Minister for Ageing.

Following the 2015 state election, Ajaka was appointed as the Minister for Ageing, the Minister for Disability Services and the Minister for Multiculturalism, and the Leader of the Liberal Party in the Legislative Council in the new second Baird government.

In February 2017, he was elected by the Legislative Council to be the President of the New South Wales Legislative Council. He was re-elected during the opening of the 57th Parliament on 7 May 2019. In February 2021, he announced his intention to retire from the NSW Parliament which took effect on 31 March 2021. He resigned as President of the Legislative Council on 24 March 2021.

References

 

 

 

 

 

1956 births
Australian people of Lebanese descent
Liberal Party of Australia members of the Parliament of New South Wales
Presidents of the New South Wales Legislative Council
Members of the New South Wales Legislative Council
Living people
21st-century Australian politicians